My Teen Romantic Comedy SNAFU is a 2013 comedy, slice of life, drama Japanese anime based on My Youth Romantic Comedy Is Wrong, as I Expected, the light novel series written by Wataru Watari. Soubu High School is filled with many different types of teenagers all wanting to fit in. Despite preferring to be a loner, Hachiman Hikigaya is forced to join fellow loner, Yukino Yukinoshita and classmate, Yui Yuigahama in forming the Soubu High School Service Club. Also being linked by a car accident in the past, these three offer help to their fellow adolescents in dealing with the struggles and complicated psychology of being a teenager.

The season is produced by Brain's Base and directed by Ai Yoshimura, with series composition by Shōtarō Suga, character design by Yū Shindō, art direction by Shigemi Ikeda, music by Monaca, and sound direction by Satoshi Motoyama. The series premiered on April 5, 2013, on TBS with later airings on MBS, CBC and BS-TBS. The twelve-episode season was followed by an extra thirteenth episode which aired on June 28, 2013, and an OVA episode on September 19, 2013, both of which were written by Watari. The season was picked up by Crunchyroll for online simulcast streaming in North America and other select parts of the world. The Anime Network and Anime on Demand also obtained the series for streaming. NBCUniversal Entertainment Japan released the season in Japan on seven Blu-ray and DVD volumes between June 26 and December 25, 2013. The season was licensed by Sentai Filmworks for distribution via select digital outlets and a home media release in North America. Madman Entertainment later acquired the rights to an Australian release.

The season use five pieces of theme music: one opening theme, three closing themes and one insert song. "Hello Alone -Yui Ballade-" by Nao Tōyama is used as the ending theme of the fifth episode. The ending theme of the Extra episode is "Hello Alone -Band Arrange-" by Saori Hayami and Nao Tōyama. "Bitter Bitter Sweet" performed by Yukino Yukinoshita (Saori Hayami) and Yui Yuigahama (Nao Tōyama) is used as the insert song of the twelfth episode.



Episode list

Home media
NBCUniversal Entertainment Japan released the series in Japan on seven Blu-ray and DVD volumes between June 26 and December 25, 2013. Three of the Limited Edition Blu-ray volumes included bonus light novels of the series. The complete series was released on DVD volumes by Sentai Filmworks on July 22, 2014 and by Madman Entertainment on September 17, 2014. Sentai Filmworks followed with a Blu-ray release on September 1, 2015. These releases contained Japanese audio with English subtitles.

Notes

References

External links
Official anime website 
 
 

My Teen Romantic Comedy SNAFU episode lists
2013 Japanese television seasons